Syncope may refer to:
 Syncope (medicine), also known as fainting
 Syncope (phonology), the loss of one or more sounds, particularly an unstressed vowel, from the interior of a word
 Syncopation, a musical effect caused by off-beat or otherwise unexpected rhythms
 Syncopation (dance), or syncopated step, a step on an unstressed beat
 Suspension, in music
 Syncope (frog), a genus of microhylidae frogs
 Syncopy Inc., a British film production company

See also 
 Syncopation (disambiguation)

Wikipedia emergency medicine articles ready to translate